The Foxfield Railway is a preserved standard gauge line located south east of Stoke-on-Trent. The line was built in 1893 to serve the colliery at Dilhorne on the Cheadle Coalfield. It joined the North Staffordshire Railway line near Blythe Bridge. It is open at weekends and operates trains on Sundays, Bank Holidays and some Saturdays from April to October and Santa Special trains in December.  It is home to the Knotty Coach Trust, The Foxfield Miniature Railway, a museum, café, bar, shop and hosts visits from the adjacent Olcote Animal Sanctuary the first three Sundays in a month.

History

The Foxfield Railway was built in 1892-1893 to provide a link to the North Staffordshire Railway for the Foxfield Colliery. The railway was built by local labour provided by North Staffordshire Railway employees at weekends and supervised by the North Staffordshire Railway foreman plate layer Noah Stanier, using second hand material, again obtained from the North Staffordshire Railway.

Preservation

When the colliery closed in August 1965, local volunteers formed the Foxfield Light Railway Society to preserve the line. At first, passengers were taken in converted trucks up the formidable 1:19 to 1:26 gradient out of the colliery site at Dilhorne, accompanied by a tank engine.

Eventually, new coaches were purchased and a station was built at Caverswall Road, Blythe Bridge, half a mile from Blythe Bridge station. The last half mile into the colliery is currently being relaid to suitable standards for passenger trains to be re-introduced.

The museum is currently being renovated to tell the story of the preservation era.

Location

The original line left the Crewe to Derby Line a little west of the station. The link has been lifted, but several abandoned wagons can be seen in the old sidings from passing trains. A station and depot have been built at Caverswall Road, half a mile north of Blythe Bridge railway station along Blythe Bridge Road.

Although located in Staffordshire, the railway has been used for the filming of sequences for the BBC Television series Cranford, which is set in Cheshire. The railway featured in the two-part Christmas special that was first broadcast in December 2009. Judi Dench, who played the part of Matilda 'Matty' Jenkyns, invited several of the main characters to ride on the train in an attempt to alter their opinions about the benefits of the railway being extended into the town of Cranford.

The station at Caverswall offers visitor facilities such as a Buffet serving hot and cold food and drinks and a Real Ale bar "The One Legged Shunter". Also a museum building displaying a variety of artifacts relating to local railways and locomotives currently out of service.  The adjacent Olcote Animal Sanctuary has an enclosure next to the miniature railway where animals can be found the first three Sundays in a month.

The railway operates Sundays and Bank Holidays from April to October and Santa Special trains during December.

Locomotive fleet
The Foxfield Railway has the largest collection of standard gauge steam locomotives in Staffordshire, most of which are of industrial origins. Also a reasonable sized collection of industrial diesels and a recently arrived (August 2020) class 142 Pacer no 142055 in working order.

Operational steam locomotives

Steam locomotives off site

Steam locomotives undergoing overhaul or restoration

Stored steam locomotives

Operational diesel locomotives

Diesel locomotives undergoing overhaul or restoration

Stored diesel locomotives

Electric locomotives

Passenger carriages
The railway has a collection of carriages from a wide range of years which are used to take passengers up and down the line.

Mk 1 Corridor Second (SK) No. M25607. (Operational, overhauled in 2019).
Mk 1 Brake Corridor Second (BSK) No. M34672, named 'Eric Swift' after a member who left a legacy which financed the overhaul of the railway's coaching stock. Operational following a major in-house rebuild, including conversion of the luggage area to a on train bar in 2021
Mk 1 Tourist Second Open (TSO) No. M4762. Operational following overhaul and completion of accessible conversion at the Llangollen Railway in 2020
 Mk 1 Tourist Second Open (TSO) No. M4243 undergoing major rebuild following discovery of major corrosion, Privately Owned.
Mk 1 Corridor Second (SK) No. M25225. Stored at Dilhorne Park awaiting major restoration. Privately Owned.
LMS Theatrical Scenery Van No. 37519 (converted to the passenger carrying Bass Belle Observation Bar Car). On static display but eventually planned to be overhauled to working order.
LMS third class gangwayed vestibule coach No. 27249. (Stored awaiting overhaul).
LTSR PMV No. 1 (rebuilt by MR in 1920 from Composite vehicle). (Stored out of use. Previously used as Kitchen vehicle).
The NSR Rolling Stock Restoration Trust
In 2008 a small group was formed with the aim of restoring the two surviving North Staffordshire Railway 4-wheeled coaches, with a long term aim of recreating a proto-typical Victorian train that would have once operated in the local area. The Knotty Trust, as it has become known as, was registered as a charity in 2009 and in 2012 received a £30,000 grant for the completion of the first vehicle (no. 127). This was completed at Stanegate Restorations, who have become a major supporter in the recreation of a Knotty Train. Since then the collection has grown to include other former 'Knotty Coaches' that have been discovered, as well as other historically important vehicles.

Freight wagons

The railway also has a selection of freight wagons, in order to preserve what remains of Britain's industrial history.

These include the ubiquitous '16 ton' mineral wagons which were associated with coal trains and the railway in the 1960s, examples of 21 ton hopper wagons also used for coal traffic and a rare ex Central Electricity Generating Board 21 ton tippler wagon that worked all its commercial life in the North Staffordshire coalfield.

References

Further reading

External links

The Railway website
Foxfield Virtual Stock List
BBC Staffordshire  - Out  & About: Foxfield Railway

Heritage railways in Staffordshire
Tourist attractions of the Peak District